Tajuria mantra, the Felder's royal, is a butterfly in the family Lycaenidae. It is found in Asia.

The larvae feed on Dendrophthoe and Scurrula species.

Subspecies
Tajuria mantra mantra (Burma, Thailand, Peninsular Malaya, Sumatra, Borneo)
Tajuria mantra jalysus (C. & R. Felder, 1865) (Sulawesi, Banggai)
Tajuria mantra kimia Treadaway & Nuyda, [1998] (Philippinen: Sanga Sanga)
Tajuria mantra maroneia Fruhstorfer, 1912 (Nias)
Tajuria mantra kitamurae Schroeder, Treadaway & Nuyda, 1999 (Philippinen: Luzon)
Tajuria mantra mesambria Fruhstorfer, 1912 (Java)
Tajuria mantra vergara Semper, 1890 (Philippines)

References

Butterflies described in 1860
Tajuria
Butterflies of Singapore
Butterflies of Borneo
Butterflies of Asia
Taxa named by Baron Cajetan von Felder
Taxa named by Rudolf Felder